The 2002 Oceania Athletics Championships were held at the Queen Elizabeth II Park in Christchurch, New Zealand, between December 12–14, 2002.  

A total of 39 events were contested, 20 by men and 19 by women.

Medal summary
Medal winners were published.  Complete results can be found in the Cool Running New Zealand newsgroup.

Men

Women

Mixed

Medal table (unofficial)

Participation (unofficial)
The participation of athletes from 16 countries could be determined from the
Cool Running New Zealand newsgroup.  Athletes

 
 
 
 
 
 
 
 
/
 
 
 
 
/

References

Oceania Athletics Championships
International athletics competitions hosted by New Zealand
Oceania Athletics Championships
Oceania Athletics Championships
December 2002 sports events in New Zealand